Budapesti Spartacus Sport Club  is a Hungarian women's handball team from Budapest, that play in the Nemzeti Bajnokság I/B, the second tier league in Hungary. The club was formed in 1954 and soon found themselves on the top. Spari, as the fans call the team, have won all but one league titles between 1960 and 1967, and in addition, they have won two domestic cup titles in 1963 and 1968. They also enjoyed a good run in the European Champions Cup, having been marched to the finals in 1965, only to fall short against HG København.

In the seventies the club have fallen back, and eventually slumped to relegation in 1975. However, the team promoted back immediately and under the guidance of head coach István Szabó a new success period has begun. Spartacus have won the national championship title in 1983 and 1986, and lifted the Hungarian cup trophy in 1988. Beside the domestic hit they also took the EHF Cup Winners' Cup in 1981.

From the nineties the club slowly relapsed and turned into a mid-table team. Parallel to this, their financial potential is narrowed and it all ended up in a relegation to the Nemzeti Bajnokság I/B in 2007.

Since they are co-operating with another Budapest-based club, Pénzügyőr SE, the team is officially known as Pénzügyőr-Spartacus SC.

Kits

Team

Current squad
Squad for the 2010–11 season

Goalkeepers
  Noémi Galambosi
  Daniella Réthelyi

Wingers
  Daniella Csoboth
  Zita Gyebrovszki
  Nikolett Somodi
  Éva Takáts

Line players
  Andrea Kaltenecker
  Szilvia Király

Back players
  Bianka Barján
  Nikolett Buzsáki
  Csenge Járai
  Anita Minárovics
  Beáta Szálkai
  Beáta Szikszai

Staff members 
  Technical Director: Imre Lakatos
  Head Coach: Zsuzsanna Viglási
  Coach: Zsuzsanna Nagy
  Coach: Éva Balázs

Selected former players 
  Ágnes Végh
  Zsuzsanna Varga
  Magda Jóna
  Klára Horváth
  Valéria Agocs
  Beáta Balog
  Orsolya Herr
  Zita Szucsánszki

Head coach history 
  Pál Nádori
  Ottó Fleck
  István Szabó
 Ervin Horváth (2002–2003)
  László Palásthy (2003–2004)
  János Csík (2004–2005)
 ifj. Szilárd Kiss (2005)
 Zoltán Marczinka (2005)
 László Laurencz (2005–2007)

Honours

Domestic competitions
Nemzeti Bajnokság I (National Championship of Hungary)
 Champions (9): 1960, 1961, 1962, 1963, 1964, 1965, 1967, 1983, 1986
 Runners-up (5): 1966, 1979, 1980, 1981, 1984
 Third place (5): 1958, 1970, 1973, 1985, 1988–89

Magyar Kupa (National Cup of Hungary)
 Winners (3): 1963, 1968, 1988
 Finalists (6): 1969, 1972, 1979, 1980, 1981, 1984

European competitions
European Champions Cup:
Finalists: 1965
EHF Cup Winners' Cup:
Winners: 1981
Finalists: 1982

Recent seasons
Seasons in Nemzeti Bajnokság I: 45
Seasons in Nemzeti Bajnokság I/B: 1

In European competition
Source: kézitörténelem.hu
Participations in Champions League (Champions Cup): 8
Participations in EHF Cup (IHF Cup): 3
Participations in Cup Winners' Cup (IHF Cup Winners' Cup): 3

References

External links 
 

Hungarian handball clubs
Handball clubs established in 1954
Sport in Budapest
1954 establishments in Hungary